The Waterman-Archer House is a historic house at 2148 Markham in Fayetteville, Arkansas.  It is a single-story Tudor Revival brick structure, whose shape is that of an H missing an arm (to the rear).  To the front, it presents two gable-ended projecting sections, joined by a central portion with its roof ridge running parallel to the street.  The right gable section has a large multipane window, with a trio of decorative square elements at the gable peak.  The entry is found at the left side of the center section, with a window beside.  Another large multipane window adorns the left gable section.  The house was built in 1929, and is a distinctive local example of Tudor Revival architecture.

The house was listed on the National Register of Historic Places in 1999.

See also
National Register of Historic Places listings in Washington County, Arkansas

References

Houses on the National Register of Historic Places in Arkansas
Tudor Revival architecture in Arkansas
Houses completed in 1929
Houses in Fayetteville, Arkansas
National Register of Historic Places in Fayetteville, Arkansas